Paulette is a 2012 French comedy-crime-film directed by Jérôme Enrico. He wrote the script in cooperation with Bianca Olsen, Laurie Aubanel and Cyril Rambour. It has been said the plot was based on true events.

Plot
Paulette and her late husband had a brasserie. Now the xenophobic old lady lives alone in a banlieue and her pension is too small to get along. In the course of a sequestration most of her furniture and also her TV set are seized. Moreover, the landline is cut off because of overdue bills. Paulette is desperate to earn money somehow and she hears there is much money to be made in dealing cannabis. She visits a known criminal named Vito in her area and asks him for work. He commissions her eventually to sell his cannabis. Yet the other dealers don't put up with her unexpected success. They beat her up and rob her. Again she is desperate because she has to deliver a certain amount of money to Vito. Instead of just distributing sheer cannabis she starts to sell cakes and biscuits spiced with cannabis. Soon there is a huge demand for her elaborate pastries. Vito's boss gets enthusiastic about her success and plans to sell her biscuits to pupils. When she refuses to support this idea, the villain kidnaps Paulette's grandson. She starts a spectacular attempt to free him but in the end it is her son-in-law Ousmane who saves the day. Finally she leaves France and opens a cannabis coffee shop in Amsterdam, hereby becoming herself the kind of person she used to dislike: an emigrant.

Cast
 Bernadette Lafont as Paulette
 Carmen Maura as Maria
 Dominique Lavanant as Lucienne
 Françoise Bertin as Renée 
 André Penvern as Walter
 Ismaël Dramé as Léo
 Jean-Baptiste Anoumon as Ousmane
 Axelle Laffont as Agnès
 Paco Boublard as Vito
 Aymen Saïdi as Rachid
 Pascal N'Zonzi as Father Baptiste

Reception
Brendan Kelly wrote for Montreal's Gazette and The Vancouver Sun the film had "its highs and lows". Carola Almsinck (kinocritics.com) wrote on the occasion of the German release "Paulette" was a "very French" film and eligible as an "amusing fairytale".

References

External links
 
 
 

2012 films
2010s crime comedy films
2010s French-language films
Films set in France
French crime comedy films
French films about cannabis
Stoner crime films
2012 comedy films
2010s French films